Christopher Khaleel Goslin (born May 12, 2000) is an American soccer player.

Early life 
Goslin was born in Kingston, Jamaica before moving to the Locust Grove, Georgia  in the United States when he was four years old.

Professional career 
On October 6, 2016, Goslin signed with Major League Soccer side Atlanta United FC as a Home Grown Player. He signed on a short-term loan deal with United Soccer League side Charleston Battery in May 2017. He made his league debut for Charleston on May 28, 2017 in a 2-1 away loss to New York Red Bulls II. Goslin was subbed off in the 80th minute, being replaced by Ataullah Guerra.  He made his main squad debut on June 6, 2018, being subbed on for Ezequiel Barco in the 85th minute in Atlanta United's U.S. Open Cup match against Charleston Battery.

After two years of being without a club, Goslin signed with Slovak Super Liga side FK Senica on July 22, 2021.

References

External links
Atlanta United Profile

 

2000 births
Living people
American soccer players
Jamaican footballers
Association football midfielders
Atlanta United FC players
Charleston Battery players
USL Championship players
Soccer players from Georgia (U.S. state)
United States men's youth international soccer players
Jamaican emigrants to the United States
African-American soccer players
People from Henry County, Georgia
Atlanta United 2 players
FK Senica players
Slovak Super Liga players
Expatriate footballers in Slovakia
Homegrown Players (MLS)
21st-century African-American sportspeople
20th-century African-American sportspeople